Andriy Anatoliyovych Zasukha (born 30 October 1986) is a Ukrainian businessman and former amateur footballer. Andriy is a son of Ukrainian family of politicians Zasukhas including his father Anatoliy Zasukha and mother Tetiana Zasukha. He became notable of creating a football club in a small village of Central Ukraine, taking it to the Ukrainian Premier League and qualifying for the European football clubs competitions.

Biography
In 2012 Andriy Zasukha became a president of FC Kolos Kovalivka.

Andriy Zasukha received a diploma from the Moscow State Institute of International Relations (MGIMO).

In 2020 in a small village near Bila Tserkva Zasukha built a new stadium transforming it out of a rural open field into a stadium which is able to accommodate 5,000 spectators, while population of Kovalivka around 1,500 residents.

Since 2020 Andriy Zasukha is a president of the Kyiv Oblast Football Federation replacing Yaroslav Moskalenko.

References

Ukrainian sports businesspeople
1986 births
Living people
People from Kyiv Oblast
Moscow State Institute of International Relations alumni
Ukrainian football chairmen and investors
FC Kolos Kovalivka